The encirclement campaign against the Hunan–Western Hubei Soviet was an encirclement campaign launched by the Chinese Nationalist Government that was intended to destroy the communist Hunan–Western Hubei Soviet and its Chinese Red Army in the local region.  The Communists' responded by launching the Counter-encirclement campaign at Hunan–Western Hubei Soviet, also called by the communists as the Counter-encirclement campaign at Hunan–Western Hubei Revolutionary Base, in which the Nationalist force defeated the local Chinese Red Army and overran the communist base in the southern Hubei and Hunan provinces from November 1930 to January 1931. Since the bulk of the fighting was fought at the second stage of the campaign, concentrated at the heart of the communist base, the Honghu region of Jingzhou, the campaign is therefore also frequently referred as the Fourth encirclement campaign against Honghu Soviet and the Fourth Counter-encirclement campaign at Honghu Revolutionary Base by the communists, or Fourth Counter-encirclement campaign at Honghu Soviet for short.

See also 
 List of battles of the Chinese Civil War
 National Revolutionary Army
 People's Liberation Army
 History of the People's Liberation Army
 Chinese Civil War

References 
Military History Research Department, Complete History of the People's Liberation Army, Military Science Publishing House in Beijing, 2000, 

Campaigns of the Chinese Civil War
1932 in China
1933 in China